2017 Auckland Open is a darts tournament that took place in Auckland, New Zealand, in 2017. The 2017 tournament took place over 3 days at the Routley Drive commune in October. The new kid on the block, Kiwi newcomer Craig Wilson, won the first final 4–0 against a jet-lagged Alex Wilson.

Move forward 10 months and the old timer Alex "darter" Wilson wins 4–2 against Craig to take the trophy on its first journey to Stewarton Scotland.

Draw

Last 16
  Josh Roberts beat  Cody Harris
  Steve Davis beat  John Kelly
  Greg Moss beat  Arnold Robson
  Craig Caldwell beat  Bruce Evans
  Mark McGrath beat  Tyson Kauika
  Tahuna Irwin beat  Mike Day
  Mick Lacey beat  Peter Hunt
  Deon Toki beat  Mark Cleaver

Quarter-finals
  Steve Davis 4–0  Josh Roberts
  Craig Caldwell 4–1  Greg Moss
  Mark McGrath 4–2  Tahuna Irwin
  Deon Toki 4–0  Mick Lacey

Semi-finals (best of 9 legs)
  Craig Caldwell 5–1  Steve Davis
  Mark McGrath 5–3  Deon Toki

Final (best of 11 legs)
  Craig Caldwell 6–5  Mark McGrath

References

2017 in darts
2017 in New Zealand sport
Darts in New Zealand